Winterville is a town in Pitt County, North Carolina, United States. The population was 10,591 as of the 2020 census. The town is a part of the Greenville Metropolitan Area.

History
The Cox-Ange House and Renston Rural Historic District are listed on the National Register of Historic Places.

Geography
Winterville is located at  (35.529934, -77.400021).

Demographics

2020 census

As of the 2020 United States census, there were 10,419 people, 4,143 households, and 2,759 families residing in the town.

2010 census
As of 2010, there were 9269 people, 1,848 households, and 1,371 families living in the town. The population density was 1,954.1 people per square mile (755.0/km). There were 1,937 housing units at an average density of 790.0 per square mile (305.3/km). The racial makeup of the town was 59.24% White, 38.36% African American, 0.35% Native American, 0.81% Asian, 0.10% Pacific Islander, 0.40% from other races, and 0.73% from two or more races. Hispanic or Latino of any race were 1.02% of the population.

Of the 1,848 households 38.6% had children under the age of 18 living with them, 53.6% were married couples living together, 17.5% had a female householder with no husband present, and 25.8% were non-families. 22.6% of households were one person and 7.6% were one person aged 65 or older. The average household size was 2.57 and the average family size was 3.01.

The age distribution was 28.0% under the age of 18, 7.9% from 18 to 24, 34.3% from 25 to 44, 19.7% from 45 to 64, and 10.2% 65 or older. The median age was 33 years. For every 100 females, there were 84.3 males. For every 100 females age 18 and over, there were 79.6 males.

The median household income was $37,230 and the median family income  was $47,167. Males had a median income of $36,004 versus $30,000 for females. The per capita income for the town was $19,810. About 10.3% of families and 11.6% of the population were below the poverty line, including 16.4% of those under age 18 and 12.4% of those age 65 or over.

Education
 Pitt Community College
 W.H. Robinson Elementary School
 A.G. Cox Middle School
 South Central High School
 Brookhaven Christian School
 Christ Covenant School
 Creekside Elementary

Parks and recreation
Winterville Parks and Recreation has four baseball fields, an amphitheater for concerts and Movie in the Park events; it also features
a mile-long trail around the park. Winterville Baseball is part of The Cal Ripken League and has succeeded in All-Star tournaments over the last decade.

Growth
In recent years, the town of Winterville has experienced major growth both residentially and commercially. Since the 1990s, subdivisions such as Winterville Crossing, Cedar Ridge, Irish Creek and many others surrounding the area have sprouted.

Notable people
 MrBeast (Jimmy Donaldson) – YouTuber and philanthropist
 Derek Cox (born 1986) – an American football cornerback for the New England Patriots of the National Football League
 Ivan Koloff – Wrestling champion

References

External links
 Official website of Winterville, NC
 Winterville Watermelon Festival
 Greenville-Pitt County Chamber of Commerce

Towns in Pitt County, North Carolina
Towns in North Carolina
Greenville, North Carolina metropolitan area